The West Coast District Municipality is a district municipality located in the Western Cape province of South Africa. Its municipality code is DC1. Moorreesburg is the seat of the district. As of 2011 it had a total population of 391,766.

Geography
It includes the coastal plain and is generally bounded on the east by the mountains of the escarpment, though in the case of the Cederberg mountains the border passes further to the east, along the Doring River, so that the mountains are included in the municipal area. The principal rivers in the area are the Berg River, which drains the southern part of the municipality, and the Olifants River, which drains the Cederberg and the northern part of the municipality.

The southernmost part of the district, adjacent to Cape Town, is known as the Swartland and is primarily a grain-farming area. The Berg River flows across the Swartland from its sources in the Boland mountains. On the coast west of the Swartland is the Cape Columbine peninsula, with a number of coastal holiday resorts as well as the ore-export harbour at Saldanha Bay. On the north the Swartland is bounded by mountains which separate it from the Olifants River Valley.

The upper valley of the Olifants is predominantly a citrus-farming region. The Cederberg mountains, much of which are a protected wilderness area, rise from the eastern bank of the river, while along the coast to the west are fishing and holiday villages. The Olifants river continues northwards until, on the edge of the Knersvlakte, it turns west towards the Atlantic. In the lower valley there is a narrow strip of lush agricultural land irrigated by the river's water. The Knersvlakte, which is part of the arid Namaqualand region, forms the northernmost part of the district.

The largest towns in the district are Vredenburg and Saldanha on the Cape Columbine peninsula, Malmesbury in the Swartland, and Vredendal in the Olifants River Valley. The district is divided into five local municipalities which are described in the following table.

The district borders to the north and northeast on the Namakwa District Municipality in the Northern Cape province, to the southeast on the Cape Winelands District Municipality, and to the south on the City of Cape Town.

Demographics
The following statistics are from the 2011 Census. Note that due to fuzzing applied to statistics, columns may not sum to exactly the indicated total.

Politics

The council of the West Coast District Municipality consists of twenty-five councillors, of whom ten are directly elected by party-list proportional representation. The other fifteen councillors are appointed by the councils of the five local municipalities in the district: Saldanha Bay appoints five, Swartland appoints four, and Matzikama, Cederberg and Bergrivier appoint two each. After the elections of 3 August 2016 there are sixteen councillors from the Democratic Alliance (DA) and nine from the African National Congress (ANC).

The following table shows the composition of the council after the 2016 election.

The following table shows the results of the election of the ten directly-elected councillors.

Mayors
 Harold Cleophas (2011;present)
 Rene Kitshoff (2008-2011)
 Jacob Botha (2005–2008)
 Hendrik Potgieter (-2005)

References

External links
 Official website
 West Coast District Municipality on the Western Cape Government website

District municipalities of the Western Cape
West Coast District Municipality